Miles Benton "Ben" Wachendorf (born 1952 in Cincinnati, Ohio) is a retired Rear Admiral in the United States Navy.

Education and Family
Wachendorf graduated with distinction from U.S. Naval Academy in 1974 with majors in mathematics and Soviet Area Studies-Russian. He later went on to study international relations in the German language as an Olmsted Scholar at the University of Zurich, received a master of science in engineering degree from the Catholic University, attended the Senior Officials in National Security program at Harvard University, and graduated from the senior officer course at the Naval War College.

Naval career
He has served afloat on both nuclear powered attack and strategic missile submarines of the Atlantic and Pacific Fleets including command of the submarine . He also commanded Submarine Development Squadron Five in San Diego, California.

Wachendorf's shore assignments included deputy assistant for Chief of Naval Operation/Vice Chief of Naval Operations decision coordination, branch head for anti-submarine warfare, chief of the Joint Staff's nuclear/counter-proliferation division.

He has also served as executive assistant to the Joint Staff director of strategic plans and policy (J-5), and director of the OPNAV Strategy and Policy Division (N51) and U.S. defense attaché to Russia. Promoted to two stars, while serving in Russia,  Wachendorf's final assignment on active duty was as Chief of Staff, Joint Forces Command, 2006–2008, when he was responsible for managing the command's warfighting initiatives and providing guidance to the command's executive staff on day-to-day matters. Additionally, he supervised all of the command's administrative issues.

Post-Naval Career
After retirement from the Navy, Wachendorf became Chief Operating Officer of EchoStorm Worldwide, LLC in Suffolk, Virginia.

References
 This article incorporates public domain material from the United States Federal Government document Rear Admiral Miles B. "Ben" Wachendorf and is in the public domain.

1952 births
Living people
United States Naval Academy alumni
Military personnel from Cincinnati
University of Zurich alumni
Catholic University of America alumni
United States submarine commanders
Harvard University alumni
Naval War College alumni
Recipients of the Legion of Merit
United States Navy admirals
Recipients of the Defense Superior Service Medal
Recipients of the Navy Distinguished Service Medal